Natasha J. Cooper (born 1951 in Kensington, London) is an English crime fiction writer.

Biography 
Cooper is the second of five children. She was born into a family of academics. Since childhood Cooper dreamed of becoming a writer. But due to her dyslexia this seemed impossible. Nevertheless, her grandmother, Catherine Wright, encouraged her to try making her dream come true.

After her formal education she started working in publishing. As a young editor she won the Tony Godwin Memorial Trust Award. After ten years in publishing Cooper decided to begin writing herself. She started with historical novels using a pen name. While working on her first series about the civil servant and romantic novelist Willow King, Cooper discovered her favored genre: crime fiction. Cooper wrote her second series about a fictional barrister named Trish Maguire. Trish has a sensitive social conscience and is always meddling in affairs outside her professional scope. Cooper's third series focuses on the character Karen Taylor, a forensic psychologist.  the fourth in this series, Vengeance in Mind, was shortlisted for the CWA Gold Dagger.

Additionally Cooper writes book reviews for the Times, the Times Literary Supplement, and the Globe and Mail. She also has a column in Crime Time. In 2007 she chaired the Harrogate Crime Writing festival.

Bibliography

Aliases 
 as Daphne Wright
 Distant Kingdom (1987)
 The Longest Winter (1989)
 Parrot Cage (1990)
 Never Such Innocence (1991)
 Dreams of Another Day (1992)
 The Tightrope Walkers (1993)
 as Kate Hatfield
 Drowning in Honey (1995)
 Angels Alone (1996)
 Marsh Light (1997)
 as Clare Layton
 Those Whom the Gods Love (2001)
 Clutch of Phantoms (2007)

Willow King 
 Festering Lilies (1990)
 Poison Flowers (1991)
 Bloody Roses (1992)
 Bitter Herbs (1994)
 Rotten Apples (1995)
 Fruiting Bodies (1996)
 Sour Grapes (1997)

Trish Maguire 
 Creeping Ivy (1998)
 Fault Lines (1999)
 Prey to All (2000)
 Out of the Dark (2002)
 A Place of Safety (2003)
 Keep Me Alive (2004)
 Gagged and Bound (2005)
 A Greater Evil (2007)
 A Poisoned Mind (2008)

Karen Taylor 
 No Escape (2009)
 Life Blood (2010)
 Face of the Devil (2011)
 Vengeance in Mind (2012)

More books 
 No More Victims (2008)

References

Sources

External links
 Cooper's web presence
 Resumes of some of Cooper's books

1951 births
Living people
Writers from London
English crime fiction writers
20th-century English women writers
21st-century English women writers
20th-century English novelists
21st-century English novelists
English women novelists
Women crime fiction writers